This is a list of the oldest extant registered generic top-level domains used in the Domain Name System of the Internet.

Until late February 1986, Domain Registration was limited to organizations with access to ARPA. Public registration was revealed on USEnet on Feb 24, 1986.

.com

.org

.edu
Registration within .edu is restricted to accredited educational institutions. Prior to October 2001, registration was available worldwide; it has since been limited to institutions based in the United States.

.net

.mil

.gov

.int

.arpa

References

Oldest

Internet domain names
Oldest things
Lists of longest-duration things